Gainesville station is a train station in Gainesville, Georgia, that is currently served by Amtrak's Crescent. The station was also known as the Gainesville Southern Railway Depot.

Constructed for the Southern Railway in 1910, the red brick station was built to replace an earlier depot damaged by a tornado in 1903. Norfolk Southern, successor of Southern Railway, uses most of the building as office space. The passenger waiting area is open for an hour before and an hour after trains arrive. The station is currently also used by a local chapter of the Fraternal Order of Eagles.

References

External links 

Gainesville Southern Railway Depot Georgia's Railway History & Heritage
Gainesville Amtrak Station USA RailGuide - TrainWeb

Gainesville, Georgia
Amtrak stations in Georgia (U.S. state)
Railway stations in the United States opened in 1910
Stations along Southern Railway lines in the United States
Transportation in Hall County, Georgia
Buildings and structures in Hall County, Georgia